The Serie B is a Mexican association football league. Eleven teams compete in one group. Since the 2021–22 season, it is two short tournaments. The top two teams directly to the semifinals & the next four teams in the standings at end of each torneo will play will play a one-game playoff to advance to the Liguilla to play for promotion to Liga Premier – Serie A, and the stadium must meet the requirements to promote as well. In the 2020–21 season, Serie B was on hiatus due to COVID-19, but Serie B was reactivated for the 2021–22 season.

Teams for 2022–23 season
Below are listed the member clubs of the Serie B for the 2022-23 season. 2 clubs returned from hiatus last season.

Teams 
{{Location map+ |Mexico |width=650|float=right |caption=Location of teams in the 2022–23 Serie B|places=

Teams on hiatus 
Provisional list of teams on hiatus for the 2022–23 season, teams may announce their return to the league before the start of the regular season.

Offseason Changes
On May 21, 2022 Aguacateros CDU was promoted to Serie A de México.
On June 1, 2022 Chilpancingo was promoted from Liga TDP.
On July 1, 2022 Cañoneros and Mazorqueros were relocated from Serie A de México.
On July 1, 2022 Pioneros de Cancún and Zitácuaro joined the league after one–year hiatus.
On July 1, 2022 Atlético Angelópolis and T'hó Mayas joined the league as expansion teams.
On August 10, 2022 Lobos Huerta declined their Liga Premier participation for 2022–23 season to participate in the Liga de Balompié Mexicano.
C.D. Cuautla and Guerreros de Xico were put on hiatus.

References

</noinclude>

 
3